Abancaya is a monotypic genus of tortrix moths belonging to the tribe Cochylini of subfamily Tortricinae.

Its sole species is Abancaya gnypeta, which is found in Peru. Both taxa were described by Józef Razowski in 1997.

References

 , 2005, World Catalogue of Insects 5
 , 1997: Euliini (Lepidoptera: Tortricidae) of Peru with descriptions of new taxa and list of the New World genera. Acta Zoologica Cracoviensia 40: 79-105.

Cochylini
Monotypic moth genera
Tortricidae genera
Taxa named by Józef Razowski